Chitrasena is a pioneering Sri Lankan dancer.

Chitrasena may also refer to:

Chitrasena (Mahabharata), a Gandharva king in the Hindu epic, Mahabharata
Mahendravarman (died 611), Cambodian king also known as Citrasena